Mehren is a surname. Notable people with the surname include:

August Ferdinand Mehren (1822–1907), Danish Orientalist and philologist 
Hans Mehren (born 1945), Norwegian sailor
Kay Mehren, American-Canadian veterinarian
Martin Mehren (1905–2002), Norwegian businessman and sportsman
Stein Mehren (1935–2017), Norwegian poet, essayist and playwright